Kenneth André Italiener (born Kenneth André Maron on 16 June 1973) is a Swedish former footballer who played as a defender and midfielder, most notably for Djurgårdens IF in Allsvenskan.

Playing career

Täby IS 
Italiener started off his career with his hometown team Täby IS. In 1993, Täby IS was a mid-table team in Division 3 Norra Svealand when they were drawn to play the Division 1 Norra team Djurgårdens IF in the 1993–94 Svenska Cupen. Djurgården ended up winning the game 2–1, but Italiener (who was known as Kenneth Maron at the time) put in such an impressive performance for Täby that Djurgården decided to sign him for the upcoming 1994 Division 1 Norra season.

Djurgårdens IF 
In 1994, Italiener played in nine league games as Djurgården won the Division 1 Norra title and was promoted to Allsvenskan. During the 1995 Allsvenskan season, he played in five league games for Djurgården as his team finished sixth in the table and qualified for the 1996 UEFA Intertoto Cup group stage.

Later career 
Italiener left Djurgården after the 1995 season and signed for Älvsjö AIK in Division 2 Västra Svealand in January 1996. He would later go on to represent both IFK Täby and Täby IS.

Honours 
Djurgårdens IF
 Division 1 Norra: 1994

References 

1973 births
Living people
Swedish footballers
Allsvenskan players
Djurgårdens IF Fotboll players
Association football defenders
People from Täby Municipality
Sportspeople from Stockholm County